Mammillaria schwarzii is a species of plant in the family Cactaceae. It is endemic to Guanajuato state in Mexico.  Its natural habitat is hot deserts.

Thought to be extinct for some time, it was rediscovered in 1987.

References

schwarzii
Cacti of Mexico
Endemic flora of Mexico
Flora of Guanajuato
Critically endangered plants
Critically endangered biota of Mexico
Critically endangered flora of North America
Taxonomy articles created by Polbot